Phintella africana is a species of jumping spider in the genus Phintella that lives in Ethiopia. The female of the species was first described in 2008 by Wanda Wesołowska and Beata Tomasiewicz. It lives in grasslands.

Taxonomy
Phintella africana was first identified in 2008 by Wanda Wesołowska and Beata Tomasiewicz. The spider was named after Africa, the continent in which it was first found. It is one of over 500 species identified by Wesołowska. The genus Phintella was raised in 1906 by Embrik Strand and W. Bösenberg. The genus name derives from the genus Phintia, which it resembles. The genus Phintia was itself renamed Phintodes, which was subsequently absorbed into Tylogonus. There are similarities between spiders within genus Phintella and those in Chira, Chrysilla, Euophrys, Icius, Jotus and Telamonia. Genetic analysis confirms that it is related to the genera Helvetia and Menemerus and is classified in the tribe Chrysillini.

Description
The spider was described based on a specimen found by Anthony Russell-Smith between 1982 and 1988. Only the female has so far been described. The species differs from other members of the genus by the fact that the copula­tory openings are at the rear edge of the epigyne. Otherwise, it is typical of the genus. The spider has a brown carapace with black rings around its eyes. The clypeus is similarly brown. The epigyne is rounded and has a single pocket.

Distribution
The spider has been found in the Sidamo Province of Ethiopia, in grasslands.

References

Citations

Bibliography

Endemic fauna of Ethiopia
Salticidae
Spiders described in 2008
Spiders of Africa
Taxa named by Wanda Wesołowska